Cibuntu is a village in the Cigandamekar district of Kuningan regency, in the province of West Java, Indonesia. The village has a population of 2,332 .

References

Districts of West Java